Bill Jones may refer to:

Sports
Bill Jones (basketball, born 1914) (1914–2006), American professional basketball player in 1942 and a pioneer of racial integration in the sport
Bill Jones (basketball, born 1936) (1936–2008), American college basketball coach who coached North Alabama University to the NCAA Division II national title in 1978–79
Bill Jones (basketball, born 1944), American college basketball coach who coached Jacksonville State University to the NCAA Division II national title in 1984–85
Bill Jones (basketball, born 1958), American professional basketball player known for his career in Australia's National Basketball League
Bill Jones (basketball, born 1966), American professional basketball journeyman in numerous countries; played collegiately for Iowa
Bill Jones (catcher), Major League Baseball player from 1882 to 1884
Bill Jones (outfielder) (1887–1946), Major League Baseball player 
Bill Jones (running back) (born 1966), American football player
Bill Jones (American football coach) (1914–1999), American high school and college football coach
Bill Jones (Australian footballer, born 1887) (1887–1979), Australian rules footballer for Geelong in 1915
Bill Jones (Australian footballer, born 1891) (1891–1961), Australian rules footballer for Richmond
Bill Jones (Australian footballer, born 1897) (1897–1967), Australian rules footballer for Geelong in 1920
Bill Jones (Australian footballer, born 1912) (1912–1987), Australian rules footballer for Carlton and North Melbourne
Bill Jones (Australian footballer, born 1920) (1920–1986), Australian rules footballer for Fitzroy
Bill Jones (Australian footballer, born 1935) (1935–1996), Australian rules footballer for Collingwood and Oakleigh
Bill Jones (footballer, born 1921) (1921–2010), English international footballer (Liverpool)
Bill Jones (footballer, born 1924) (1924–1995), English footballer (Manchester City, Chester City)
Bill Jones (Notre Dame football), American football player and coach at Notre Dame University, and head coach at Carroll College 1931–1932
Bill Jones (speed skater) (1923–2003), British Olympic speed skater
Bill Jones (sportscaster), sportscaster based in Dallas

Politics
Bill Jones (California politician) (born 1949), former California Secretary of State
Bill Jones (Mississippi politician), former member of the Mississippi House of Representatives
Bill Jones (academic), Lecturer at Liverpool Hope University who writes books about politics.

Arts and entertainment
Bill Jones (artist) (born 1946), photographer, installation artist and performer based in New York
Bill Jones (musician), English folk singer
Bill T. Jones (born 1952), American artistic director, choreographer and dancer

Other
Bill Jones (steelmaking) (1839–1889), American steelmaking inventor and manager
Bill Jones (trade unionist) (1900–1988), British trade unionist
Canada Bill Jones (c. 1837–1877), confidence man, riverboat gambler, and card sharp

See also
Billy Jones (disambiguation)
Will Jones (disambiguation)
William Jones (disambiguation)
Willie Jones (disambiguation)
Bill Ryder-Jones (born 1983), guitarist with Wirral band The Coral